Steven Newkirk (born December 21, 1957) is a former swimmer. He competed in four events at the 1976 Summer Olympics representing the United States Virgin Islands.

References

External links
 

1957 births
Living people
United States Virgin Islands male swimmers
Olympic swimmers of the United States Virgin Islands
Swimmers at the 1976 Summer Olympics
Place of birth missing (living people)